Chapai Nawabganj-2 is a constituency represented in the Jatiya Sangsad (National Parliament) of Bangladesh since 2023 by Md. Ziaur Rahman of the Bangladesh Awami League.

Boundaries 
The constituency encompasses Nachole, Gomostapur, Bholahat.

History 
The constituency was created in 1984 from the Rajshahi-2 constituency when the former Rajshahi District was split into four districts: Nawabganj, Naogaon, Rajshahi, and Natore.

Members of Parliament

References

External links
 

Parliamentary constituencies in Bangladesh
Chapai Nawabganj District